Jistebnice is a town in Tábor District in the South Bohemian Region of the Czech Republic. It has about 2,100 inhabitants.

Administrative parts
Villages of Alenina Lhota, Božejovice, Chlum, Cunkov, Drahnětice, Hodkov, Hůrka, Javoří, Jezviny, Křivošín, Makov, Nehonín, Orlov, Ostrý, Ounuz, Padařov, Plechov, Podol, Pohoří, Smrkov, Stružinec, Svoříž, Třemešná, Vlásenice, Zbelítov and Zvěstonín are administrative parts of Jistebnice.

Geography
It lies in the Vlašim Uplands. The municipal territory is rich on ponds, fed by local minor streams.

History
The first written mention of Jistebnice is from 1262, when it was a market village owned by the Rosenberg family. In the 15th century, during the Hussite Wars, many citizens left Jistebnice and went to the newly founded Tábor, which was co-founded by the Hussite governor Petr Hromádka from Jistebnice.

In 1872, the Jistebnice hymn book was founded in Jistebnice.

Jistebnice became a town for the first time before 1654. It lost this status after 1945 and it became a town again on 17 October 2011.

Demographics

Sights

The landmark of Jistebnice is the Church of Saint Michael the Archangel. It has a Romanesque core from the early 13th century. The church was gothic rebuilt in 1380–1385 and baroque rebuilt in 1718, then Gothic modifications were made in the second half of the 19th century.

On the town square there is Vlašský dům, also called Old Castle. It is originally a Renaissance castle from the second half of the 16th century. It was baroque rebuilt in the second half of the 18th century. Today it houses the memorial hall of the painter Richard Lauda, local native.

The Jistebnice Castle is a neo-Gothic castle built in 1878–1882. It is surrounded by an English park, which was designed by the architect František Thomayer. Today the castle is privately owned and inaccessible.

Jistebnice Fort was built by the Rosenbergs in the 13th century. The remains of the fortress include two semicircular bastions. It is inaccessible and dilapidated.

Notable people
Otto Katz (1895–1952), spy

References

External links

Cities and towns in the Czech Republic
Populated places in Tábor District